The 2006–07 Stanford Cardinal men's basketball team represents Stanford University during the 2006–07 NCAA Division I men's basketball season. The Cardinal are led by third year head coach Trent Johnson, and play their home games at Maples Pavilion as a member of the Pacific-10 Conference.

Previous season 
The Cardinal finished the 2005–06 season 16–14, 11–7 in Pac-10 play to finish tied for fourth place, losing the tie-breaker against Arizona (0-2 versus Arizona). They lost in the quarterfinals of the Pac-10 tournament to the fourth seed Arizona 73-68. Stanford accepted an invitation to the 2006 NIT winning in the opening round game against Virginia, but would lose to Missouri State in the next round.

Offseason

Departures

Incoming

Transfer In

Roster

Schedule and results

|-
!colspan=12 style=| Exhibition

|-
!colspan=12 style=| Regular season

|-
!colspan=12 style=| Pac-10 tournament

|-
!colspan=12 style=| NCAA tournament

Source:

References

Stanford Cardinal men's basketball seasons
Stanford
Stanford
Stanford